The Territorial Prelature of Pompei also called the Territorial Prelature of the Blessed Virgin Mary of the Most Holy Rosary is a Roman Catholic territorial prelature located in the city of Pompei in the Ecclesiastical province of Napoli in Italy. The cathedral of the territorial prelature is the Shrine of the Virgin of the Rosary of Pompei.

History
20 March 1926: Established as Territorial Prelature of Beatissima Vergine Maria del Santissimo Rosario
8 May 1951: Renamed as Territorial Prelature of Pompei

Leadership
Prelates of Pompei
Tommaso Caputo (10 November 2012 – present)
Carlo Liberati (5 November 2003 – 10 November 2012)
Domenico Sorrentino (17 February 2001 – 2 August 2003)
Francesco Saverio Toppi, O.F.M. Cap. (13 October 1990 – 17 February 2001)
Domenico Vacchiano (30 March 1978 – 13 October 1990)
Aurelio Signora (12 March 1957 – 1977)
Roberto Ronca (8 May 1951 – 1955)
Prelates of Beatissima Vergine Maria del Santissimo Rosario
Roberto Ronca (21 June 1948 – 8 May 1951)
 Antonio Anastasio Rossi (19 December 1927 – 29 March 1948)
 Carlo Cremonesi (21 March 1926 – 19 December 1927)

References

External links
 GCatholic.org 
 Catholic Hierarchy 
  Prelature website

Pompei
Pompei
Roman Catholic Archdiocese of Pompei
Pompei
Christian organizations established in 1926
Roman Catholic dioceses and prelatures established in the 20th century